Amelia Guelph can refer to:
 Princess Amelia of Great Britain (1711–1786)
 Princess Amelia of the United Kingdom (1783–1810)